The Republic of Chile has an extensive network of embassies and consulates around the world to support its foreign policy. Its international presence is listed below, excluding its large array of honorary consulates. Also excluded are trade missions, with the exception of the trade office in Taipei, which functions as a de facto embassy to Taiwan.

Current missions

Africa

Americas

Asia

Europe

Oceania

Multilateral organisations

Gallery

Closed missions

Africa

See also
Foreign relations of Chile
List of diplomatic missions in Chile
Visa policy of Chile

Notes

References

External links

 Ministry of Foreign Affairs of Chile

 
Diplomatic missions
Chile